The 2019–20 season is Arsenal Women's Football Club's 34rd season of competitive football. The club participates in the Champions League, the Women's Super League, the FA Cup and the League Cup. The club is the defending Women's Super League champion.

Review

2019 FIFA Women's World Cup
 The 2019–20 season is coming off the back of the 2019 FIFA Women's World Cup which was played in France. A total of ten Gunners were competing at the World Cup with five different countries. Both Scotland and The Netherlands both had three Arsenal players in their roster: Jen Beattie, Kim Little and Lisa Evans for Scotland and Daniëlle van de Donk, Jill Roord and Vivianne Miedema for The Netherlands. Leah Williamson and Beth Mead were in the England squad while Pauline Peyraud-Magnin played for hosts France and Leonie Maier for Germany.

The Dutch got the furthest in the tournament, ultimately being defeated 2–0 by the United States in the final winning them the silver medal in only their second World Cup appearance. England got fourth place after losing the third place play-off against Sweden 1–2. France got knocked out in the quarter-finals by the United States (1–2), Germany was beaten 1–2 by Sweden in the quarter-finals and Scotland was not able to get out of their group.

Pre-season

Emirates Cup
The first pre-season friendly was against Bayern München in the Emirates Cup on 28 July, played in the Emirates Stadium. The women's team played this as a double-header with the men, who played Olympique Lyonnais later that afternoon. The team were still missing their Dutch and English internationals, who were not yet in training as they just returned from holiday after playing in the later stages of the World Cup. Aside from those missing internationals, the team had only been in pre-season for one and a half weeks whilst Bayern's season would start in a few weeks. Bayern won the match 0–1, with Melanie Leupolz heading in a free-kick in the first half. The match was overshadowed by Danielle Carter going off the field on a stretcher late in the second half. It was later revealed that she had sustained an ACL injury, which will keep her off the pitch for a long time. This just after she had come back from an ACL injury for which she had been out for almost a year.

Coach Joe Montemurro admitted that the game came a bit too early in their pre-season, but that it was a great occasion to showcase the women's game to a bigger crowd. He would've liked to come up against opposition of this kind a bit further into the pre-season, but the chance came along to be part of the Emirates Cup. It was important though to make sure the World Cup players were given a good rest before starting pre-season at the club.

Playing Europe's best
The first part of pre-season included the previously mentioned match against Bayern and further friendlies against VfL Wolfsburg (two-time Champions League winner and 2018-19 quarter-finalist) and FC Barcelona (2018-19 Champions League finalist). A 3–0 defeat against the current German champions in the Austrian mountains and a 2–5 defeat at home against Barça showed that the team still has work to do in order to prepare for the upcoming European season. One of the issues seems the absence of Lia Wälti, who is still recovering from a knee injury. She plays as defensive midfielder and Joe Montemurro has attempted to work around her injury by trying other players on that position or other formations, but none seem to have had the desired effect - a problem that will need solving before the season begins.

Preparing for the domestic competition
After going head-to-head against the best European teams, Montemurro's team went on to play two more friendlies to prepare for the domestic season. They first played West Ham United behind closed doors, winning it 2–0. The final pre-season game came on 25 August against North London rivals Tottenham Hotspur which was won 6–0 with a hat-trick by new signing Jill Roord and further goals by fellow new signing Jen Beattie, 2018/19 topscorer Vivianne Miedema and Jordan Nobbs, who returned to the pitch after being out since November 2018 with an ACL injury.

September
 The Gunners' season started in September with a home game against West Ham United (8 September), which saw the official debuts of Jill Roord, Leonie Maier and Manuela Zinsberger – Jen Beattie made her second debut for the club. Beth Mead put Arsenal ahead after 14 minutes and Roord scored on her debut before half-time. A second half goal by Martha Thomas saw West Ham bring the score to 2–1 and they could've leveled it just before the end of the match when they were awarded an indirect free-kick after Arsenal goalkeeper Zinsberger picked up what the referee perceived to be a backpass, but the shot was saved by Zinsberger.

After more than five years Arsenal returned to the Champions League with their 12 September match in Italy against Fiorentina in which they ran out 0–4 winners thanks to two goals by Vivianne Miedema (who was missing from the West Ham match because of a tight hamstring), and a goal a piece by Lisa Evans and Kim Little. Advancement to the next round seems pretty certain, but Arsenal welcomes Fiorentina to Meadow Park on 26 September for the return fixture.

On 16 September the Gunners traveled to Leigh Sports Village to play newly promoted Championship champions Manchester United. It was a very tight match, with good chances on both sides: Jane Ross had her promising attack stopped by Zinsberger and Miedema saw her attempts frustrated by Mary Earps. A 89th-minute goal from Daniëlle van de Donk proving to be the difference between the two teams that evening, the fixture ending in 0–1 and Arsenal maintaining their good start to the league season.

The next competition to kick-off was the League Cup, in which Arsenal first traveled to newly-formed London City Lionesses on 22 September. On paper it should be a relatively easy tie against the second-tier Lionesses and so it turned out to be: Mead bagged a hat-trick while Roord and Mitchell got one each, ending the game at 0–5 and topping the group after this first game.

Fiorentina visited Meadow Park for the first home Champions League game in more than five years on 26 September. Arsenal had already scored four away goals, thus this game shouldn't be more than a formality. A first-half penalty by Little and a second half goal from Miedema ended the game in 2–0, the Gunners winning the tie 6–0 on aggregate.

League action returned when Brighton & Hove Albion visited Meadow Park on 29 September for the third league game of the season. The Gunners ran out clear 4–0 victors, with Little, Miedema, Van de Donk and Nobbs all bagging one goal each. Besides scoring one goal, Miedema also assisted the goals for Little and Van de Donk.

October
 After the October international break, Arsenal visited Chelsea at Kingsmeadow on 13 October. The Gunners took the early lead through a Van de Donk goal but seemed disjointed and underperforming in the second half, allowing in two Chelsea goals causing the first defeat this season and ending their run of 11 matches unbeaten. As a result of the 2–1 defeat, the team dropped down to third in the league rankings.

A quick turn-around was needed, as the team played Slavia Praha in mid-week for the first tie in the round-of-16 of the Champions League. Arsenal showed how to bounce back, with Miedema scoring a hat-trick in the first half, before adding another one after the break and Little scoring a penalty. Leading 0–5, coach Montemurro opted to rest some players and take off McCabe and Williamson for Mitchell and Quinn and substituted Miedema off for Roord. Slavia were able to score twice after this, ending the game in 2–5 – taking home a clear advantage to Meadow Park in two weeks time.

That Sunday (20 October), Charlton Athletic visited Meadow Park for the second match in the League Cup. Beattie scored her first goal back for the club in the 34th minute, before the game was wrapped up in a timespan of ten minutes with Van de Donk scoring twice, just before and after the break and Mead getting in on the scoring action too, ending the game in a clear 4–0 victory. Only point of worry was Miedema going off the pitch in the final stages of the match, after getting a kick to the calf - Montemurro had run out of substitutes and the Gunners played the remaining minutes with 10.

Back to the league, Manchester City came to Arsenal's home on 27 October. City were the only side who hadn't dropped any points in the league yet and were on top of the league. Great play between Little and Miedema saw the latter score her 49th goal in as many starts for the club, slotting the ball low past City goalkeeper Ellie Roebuck. Her goal turned out to be the only one in the game, though Nobbs came very close in the latter stages of the second half, but missed an absolute sitter a few yards from the goal. With the 1–0 victory, Arsenal moved up to second, just one point behind Chelsea.

Arsenal finished off October with a solid 8–0 thumping of Slavia in the Champions League return. The tie was already clearly in Arsenal's favour, having a three-goal advantage - meaning that Slavia would've needed to score at least four goals (away-goal rule) in order to progress. However, the home team left the visitors no chances, the Gunners were clearly on top in this fixture which saw Van de Donk and Miedema both score a hat-trick, with Little (penalty) and Roord each scoring one. Arsenal move on to the quarter-finals, the tie ending in 13–2 on aggregate.

November
 The first game of November was played at Brighton & Hove Albion on 3 November in the groupstage of the League Cup. No goals were scored in regular time, gaining both teams one point. Afterwards, a penalty shoot-out was held to determine the winner of another point. Little and Mead missed their penalties, four of the five Brighton players were able to score - giving the second point to Brighton.

After the international break, the Gunners played Tottenham Hotspur on 17 November in the first women's league North London Derby, at the new Tottenham Hotspur Stadium. The first half was pretty even between Arsenal and rivals Spurs, but in the end a league record crowd of 38,262 saw Arsenal win 2–0, thanks to second-half goals from Little and Miedema.

Back to the League Cup, Arsenal welcomed Bristol City to Meadow Park on 21 November in this mid-week game in the League Cup. The game stayed 0–0 for a long time in the first half, but Little found the back of the net after 33 minutes. This was the start of plenty of Arsenal goals: Little scored two, as did Miedema. Further goals came from Roord, Nobbs and Beattie. The game ended in 7–0 with advancement to the knock-out stages of the League Cup all but secured.

The last game of November, on the 24th was against bottom of the league Liverpool. Although standing last in the league, Liverpool hadn't conceded many goals throughout the season. This game was no different, a first-half goal by Miedema making the difference to decide this match: 1–0.

December

 When Bristol City returned to Meadow Park for the league on 1 December, Arsenal continued where they left off in the League Cup 10 days prior. In a new record win for the Women's Super League, the Gunners put 11 goals past Bristol, in what could only be described as a Miedema masterclass. In her 70 minutes on the pitch, she scored six and assisted another four goals: two scored by Evans, and one each by Williamson and Nobbs. Miedema was thus involved in all ten goals scored when she was on the pitch. After being substituted, two further goals were scored: one by Mitchell - who substituted on for Miedema and one by Bristol's Yana Daniels, who put away a penalty rebound ending the game in 11–1.

A week later on 8 December Arsenal went to Adams Park to take on Reading in the league. After a slow start (first 30 minutes) in which Reading played a high press, making it difficult for Arsenal to execute their game plan, Miedema was the first to score. Ten minutes later Little finished a superbe team-goal, engineered by her with one-touch passing between her, Nobbs and Williamson. After the break, not much changed for the scoreline until the first minute of extra time when Miedema dinked the ball over the keeper into the net after a long pass by Van de Donk, ending the game in 0–3.

Arsenal welcomed London Bees on 11 December for the final groupstage game in the League Cup. The difference between the Super League champions and the Championship side was quite clear, a hattrick from both McCabe and Melisa Filis, a further two goals by Evans and one by Mead and a clean sheet producing the 9–0 end result.

In the last game of 2019, Arsenal traveled to Everton on 15 December for their league game. Game started off well, Miedema scoring the first inside 15 minutes. Halfway through the first half, Gabrielle George collided with Mead causing the latter to be stretchered off the field, letting Arsenal fans - all to familiar with injuries over the last seasons - fear the worst. The second half produced the end result: a Little penalty, another Miedema goal and an Everton goal by Chloe Kelly ending the game in 1–3. Luckily for the Gunners, Arsenal later reported that after taking x-rays of her leg, Mead's injuries weren't as bad as they seemed during the game - only sustaining bruising to her lower leg.

January
 The new year started off with a visit by Birmingham City to Meadow Park on 5 January. A first-half goal each from Little and Nobbs resulting in a 2–0 win. The Birmingham side had been a mainstay in the top four for recent seasons, but managerial changes and important players transferring out has left the club fighting to stay up thus far this season.

A week later (12 January), the Gunners traveled to Brighton & Hove Albion. In the reverse fixture, Arsenal had beaten the Seagulls 4–0 and this match had the same result: first-half goals by Van de Donk and Roord and second-half goals by Nobbs and Mead ensuring another 0–4 win.

In the mid-week on 15 January, Reading came to Meadow Park in the quarter finals of the league cup. A lone second-half (86th minute) strike by Kim Little the difference between the two sides, advancing the Gunners to the semi-finals.

On 19 January, the Gunners welcomed Chelsea to Meadow Park. The first 20 minutes from the visitors was an onslaught, striking three times - by England, Kerr and Ingle, leaving the Gunners no chance to get into the game. Reiten scored a fourth in the second-half before Mead got a consolation goal. Manager Montemurro later admitted that he got the tactics wrong in attempting to press a bit higher up the pitch and stop them from playing through the middle and to create overloads in the middle of the park, which allowed Chelsea to easily attack from the sides.

Arsenal entered the season's FA Cup in the fourth round, drawing fellow WSL-side West Ham United. The Gunners had to get over the defeat against Chelsea in order to advance to the next round of the cup, playing against the Irons away on 26 January. A first-half goal by McCabe and a second-half one from Wälti giving the team the 0–2 win and advancement to the fifth round.

In the other cup competition, the League Cup, Arsenal hosted Manchester City in the semi-finals on 29 January. A close match, but with Arsenal taking a 2–0 lead in the first half with goals from Miedema and Van de Donk. City got one back in the second half through Bonner, but the end result was 2–1, sending Arsenal through to the final against Chelsea.

February
 Arsenal visited the Academy Stadium on 2 February to play Manchester City for the league, only four days after their League Cup semi-final victory. This time around though the roles are reversed with City scoring two goals around half time. Van de Donk put one in the back of the net halfway through the second half to produce the end result: 2–1.

After the little snag in the Gunners' league campaign, they visited Liverpool on 13 February. Liverpool went a goal up early in the first half via Babajide. Miedema scored the equalizer halfway through, for Nobbs to add to the tally just minutes later. Just before half-time, Liverpool drew back level via Furness to got 2–2 into the break. Late in the second half, Arsenal were able to get the result they wanted: Miedema scoring to end the game 3–2.

For the fifth round in the FA Cup, the Gunners were scheduled to play Lewes on 16 February, but due to adverse weather conditions the game had to be postponed until a week later at 23 February, which in turn postponed the hometie against Reading for the league. A debut goal for winter-signing Foord and a strike by Van de Donk secured advancement to the quarter-finals: 2–0.

The City Ground played host for the League Cup final against Chelsea. Arsenal had advanced to the final after beating Reading and Manchester City in the knockout phase, while Chelsea had gone past Aston Villa and Manchester United. Chelsea were quick to get a goal behind Zinsberger: England scoring in the ninth minute of the game. Both teams had spells of possession, but Arsenal seemed more in control of the game. Williamson equalized in the 85th minute, only to see it outdone by England scoring her second goal of the evening in the second minute of stoppage time, ending the game 1–2.

Season curtailed due to COVID-19
Due to the COVID-19 pandemic, the FA decided to suspend the league on 13 March, first until April but later indefinitively. On 25 May it was announced that the season will not be continued, with the end standings determined on 5 June based on points per game, resulting in a third place for Arsenal. The season's Champions League play-offs will be played in August, while the FA Cup will be finished in September.

Squad statistics
Statistics as of 29 February 2020

Appearances and goals

Goalscorers

Disciplinary record

Clean sheets

Transfers, loans and other signings

Transfers in

Contract extensions

Transfers out

Loans out

Current injuries

Suspensions

Pre-season

Emirates Cup

Friendlies

Competitions

Women's Super League

Matches

League table

Results summary

Results by matchday

FA Cup 

As a member of the top two tiers, Arsenal entered the FA Cup in the fourth round. The stages of the FA Cup from the quarter-finals were postponed due to the COVID-19 pandemic.

League Cup

Group stage 
Group B

Knockout phase

Champions League 

The stages beyond the round of 16 the Champions League knockout stages for were postponed due to the COVID-19 pandemic. UEFA has allowed six (new) additional players to be registered for the club to play in these matches.

Round of 32

Round of 16

Quarter-finals

References

External links
 Official website

Arsenal W.F.C. seasons
Arsenal